This is a list of the Sites of Special Scientific Interest (SSSIs) in Staffordshire, England. For other counties, see List of SSSIs by Area of Search.

 
Staffordshire
Sites of Special